γ-Curcumene synthase (EC 4.2.3.94, PatTpsA (gene)) is an enzyme with systematic name (2E,6E)-farnesyl-diphosphate diphosphate-lyase (cyclizing, γ-curcumene-forming). This enzyme catalyses the following chemical reaction

 (2E,6E)-farnesyl diphosphate  γ-curcumene + diphosphate

This enzyme is one of five sesquiterpenoid synthases in Pogostemon cablin (patchouli).

References

External links 
 

EC 4.2.3